"Jungle" is a song by British rapper Professor Green, released as the fourth and final single from his debut studio album, Alive Till I'm Dead. The track features vocals from Irish singer Maverick Sabre. The single was released was on 3 January 2011. The track won an award for "Best Dancefloor Filler" at the 2011 NME Awards. The music video for "Jungle" was shot in Green's hometown of Hackney, London. Green revealed that, in the video he hired locals instead of actors. The video was released on 9 November 2010.

Remixes and covers
The song was officially remixed by Klashnekoff, Chelsea Marie Duffield Robert long. Wretch 32 and Malik of MD7. The remix was released on 19 January 2011 as a free download through Green's Twitter as part of his #FridayFreeness series.

Track listing

Chart performance
"Jungle" debuted on the UK Singles Chart on 19 December 2010 at number 62. The following week, the single climbed 7 places to number 55; before falling 2 places on 2 January 2011. Upon official release the week after, "Jungle" jumped 22 places to number 33; marking Professor Green's fourth consecutive Top 40 hit, the fifth including "Game Over". The single also made a debut on the UK R&B Chart on 5 December 2010, where following a further six weeks on the chart reached a peak of number 9. On 16 January, the single climbed a further 2 places to peak at number 31.

Release history

References

2011 singles
Maverick Sabre songs
Professor Green songs
Virgin Records singles
2010 songs
Songs written by Professor Green